Jean-José Cuenca (born 22 April 1986) is a French footballer who plays as a midfielder.

Cuencua played for Olympique Lyonnais youth teams, playing alongside Karim Benzema and Hatem Ben Arfa. He signed for Scottish First Division club Livingston in June 2008 from Angoulême on a free transfer. Cuenca made eight league appearances but was released at the end of the 2008–09 season.

External links

1986 births
Living people
French people of Spanish descent
Association football midfielders
French footballers
French expatriate footballers
Expatriate footballers in Scotland
Angoulême Charente FC players
Livingston F.C. players
Scottish Football League players
People from Bourgoin-Jallieu
Sportspeople from Isère
Footballers from Auvergne-Rhône-Alpes